Trethowel is a hamlet north of St Austell, Cornwall, England, United Kingdom.

References

Hamlets in Cornwall